Wolfgang Ambros  is an Austrian singer-songwriter. He is one of the most important contemporary Austrian musicians and is considered to be one of the founders of Austropop.

Life

1952–1970 
Wolfgang Ambros was born in the Semmelweisklinik in Vienna and spent his early years in Wolfsgraben, Lower Austria. His father ran the primary school there, his mother worked as a teacher. Later the family moved to Preßbaum. Ambros attended the Bundeskonvikt in Vienna's 2nd district and the Gymnasium Astgasse in Vienna's 14th district, and later trained as a screen printer at the Graphische Lehr- und Versuchsanstalt (training discontinued). He first worked as a typewriter mechanic, display arranger and as a record salesman in Vienna and for a year in London.

Music
His most famous songs are "Schifoan", "Es lebe der Zentralfriedhof" and "Zwickt's mi". "Schifoan" is effectively an anthem for the Austrian ski tourism and industry. Many Austrian skiers—but also many others—know the lyrics of this song.

His musical styles are pop-rock and sometimes blues-elements. His first LP Es lebe der Zentralfriedhof was very controversial, because many critics accused him of copying and plagiarizing Georg Danzer.

Ambros also released 3 cover albums (including songs by Bob Dylan, Tom Waits and Hans Moser. His latest album Steh grod (2006) is very successful.

Cooperations
Since 1978 Ambros has cooperated with the duo Tauchen/Prokopetz, who were very successful with DÖF in the 1980s. Also since 1978 Ambros has sung at live concerts with his band No. 1 vom Wienerwald.

In the 1980s Ambros sang together with André Heller. One of his biggest concerts took place at the Wiener Weststadion. Another one on the Kitzsteinhorn was the highest place a rock concert ever took place.

There were also cooperative efforts with the Viennese blues-musicians Harry Stampfer, Hans Thessink, Günter Dzikowski and DJ Kidpariz.

In 1997 he founded with Rainhard Fendrich and Georg Danzer the public charity "Initiative für Obdachlose" and the project Austria 3. On 10 December 1997 they were playing a unique concert, singing as group their own (solo) songs. The concert was done to collect money for homeless people and their public charity. Because of the success of this concert they continued this project and made many concerts in Austria and Germany and released three live-CDs from 1998 to 2000 (and some greatest hits-CDs).

In 2005 he released the Album Der alte Sünder – Ambros singt Moser, which was a cover album recorded with Christian Kolonovits.

In 2002 he won the AMADEUS Austrian Music Award.

Discography

Albums 
 1972: Alles andere zählt net mehr
 1973: Eigenheiten
 1976: Es lebe der Zentralfriedhof
 1976: 19 Class A Numbers
 1977: Hoffnungslos
 1978: Wie im Schlaf (Lieder von Bob Dylan – Gesungen Von W. Ambros)
 1979: Nie und nimmer
 1980: Weiß wie Schnee
 1981: Selbstbewusst
 1983: Der letzte Tanz
 1984: Der Sinn des Lebens
 1985: No. 13
 1987: Gewitter
 1989: Mann und Frau
 1990: Stille Glut
 1992: Äquator
 1994: Wasserfall
 1996: Verwahrlost aber frei
 1999: Voom Voom Vanilla Camera
 2000: Nach mir die Sintflut – Ambros singt Waits
 2003: Namenlos
 2005: Der Alte Sünder – Ambros singt Moser (songs by Hans Moser – sung by W. Ambros with the Ambassade Orchester Wien)
 2006: Steh Grod
 2007: Ambros singt Moser – Die 2te (songs by Hans Moser – sung by W. Ambros with the Ambassade Orchester Wien)
 2009: Wolfgang Ambros Ultimativ Symphonisch (sung by W. Ambros with the Ambassade Orchester Wien)
 2012: 19 03 52

Live albums
 1979: Live ...auf ana langen finstern Strassn (2 LPs)
 1983: Ambros + Fendrich Open Air
 1986: Selected Live (2 CDs)
 1987: Gala Concert
 1991: Watzmann Live (2 CDs with 25 Tracks; Re-Release, 2005, 2 CDs with 40 Tracks)
 1997: Verwahrlost Aber Live
 2002: Hoffnungslos Selbstbewusst
 2007: Ambros Pur! (Duo Konzert mit G. Dzikowski – Live aus der Kulisse/Wien (DVD)

Plays
 1973: Fäustling
 1974: Der Watzmann ruft
 1978: Schaffnerlos (Die letzte Fahrt des Schaffners Fritz Knottek)
 1981: Augustin (Eine Geschichte aus Wien)

Singles

References

External links
 Official website 
 Austria 3 Official website 

Living people
20th-century Austrian male singers
Wienerlied
21st-century Austrian male singers
Year of birth missing (living people)
Bellaphon Records artists